Prichard House may refer to:

Prichard House (Carthage, Missouri), listed on the National Register of Historic Places in Jasper County, Missouri
Prichard House (Huntington, West Virginia), listed on the National Register of Historic Places in Cabell County, West Virginia